Weyburn Airport  is located  north-east of Weyburn, Saskatchewan, Canada at the hamlet of North Weyburn.

History
The aerodrome was constructed in 1941 by the Royal Canadian Air Force (RCAF) as part of the British Commonwealth Air Training Plan. The station was home to No. 41 Service Flying Training School, and during its operation graduated 1,055 pilots and recorded more than 180,000 hours of flight time before being abandoned on 30 June 1944.

Post-war
Other uses included a children's physiological hospital in the 1950s and the home of the Western Christian College from 1957 until 1989.

Current use
Some of the original hangars are still in existence.

Two runways remain in operation, while runway 18/36 is abandoned.

See also 
 List of airports in Saskatchewan
 RCAF Station Weyburn

References

External links
City of Weyburn Services

Certified airports in Saskatchewan
Airports established in 1941
Airports of the British Commonwealth Air Training Plan
Weyburn No. 67, Saskatchewan
Weyburn